St. Xavier's College, Patna (SXC Patna or SXC) is an undergraduate college of Arts, IT and Commerce under Aryabhatta Knowledge University, Patna in Patna, Bihar, India. Founded in 2009, it is named after St. Francis Xavier, a Spanish Jesuit saint of the 16th century and missionary to India. It is a co-educational, self-financed, Catholic minority institution, operated by the Patna Province of the Society of Jesus.

History
The Jesuits first came to Patna in 1919, and in early 1930 were approached to set up a school in the city of Patna. Fr. Loesch, assisted by Fr. Marshall D. Moran, opened a Cambridge school to serve Patna and Bihar. Later, in 1940, St. Xavier's High School, Patna was built at Gandhi Maidan Marg. Then in 2009 the Jesuits founded St. Xavier's College, Patna. Classes began at a temporary location opposite St. Michael's High School, Digha. In June 2011 the college moved to its permanent location on a sprawling, 36- acre campus at XTTI on Digha Ashiana Road.

Authority
The college was founded in Patna in 2009 with its first principal Fr. T. Nishant, S.J. and he is still the principal.

Other present authorities are 
Rector Fr. Joseph Thadavanal, S.J.
Vice principal Fr. Dr. Martin Poras, S.J.
Administrator Fr. Dr. Raj Kumar, S.J.
Controller of Examinations Fr. Dr. Alphonse Sebastian, S.J.
Finance officer Fr. Alphonse Crasta, S.J.

Academics

St. Xavier's College, Patna, offers three-year undergraduate degree courses, such as Bachelor of Arts (B.A. Hons.) English and Economics and Bachelor of Commerce (B.Com.) from Magadh University, and Bachelor of Business Administration (B.B.A.) and Computer Application (B.C.A.) from Aryabhatta Knowledge University. Besides mid-term tests, students are evaluated through at least two examinations at the end of each term. Failure in these examinations disqualifies them from the annual University examinations.

Clubs and societies
These are the famous clubs and Societies of students at St. Xavier's College Patna campus.
Xavier's Music club
Xavier's Sports club
Xavier's Dance club
Xavier's Theatre club
Xavier's Poetry club
Xavier's social Awareness club
YFI- Youth For Free India
Xavier's Placement Cell
Xavier's public address club and many more such clubs and societies are there in SXC Patna where students take membership and work under

Emblem
The college emblem contains the motto Pravahito Gyan Ganga Pravah (Sanskrit): "Let the streams of Gyan (knowledge) Ganga keep on flowing." The college is situated beside the river Ganga and like the flowing river would ensure that the streams of Gyan keep on flowing and liberating people, building bridges of understanding. The Sun with the letters IHS (first three letters for Jesus in Greek) is a symbol for the Society of Jesus. The emblem within the emblem, containing crown and crescent moon, is the coat of arms of the noble family of its patron, St. Francis Xavier.

Sister institutions
The sister institutions of St. Xavier's College in Patna are
St. Xavier's High School, Patna
St. Michael's High School, Patna
St. Xavier's College of Education

See also
 List of Jesuit sites

References

External links
official website

Educational institutions established in 2009
Universities and colleges in Patna
Jesuit universities and colleges in India
2009 establishments in Bihar